Sitrion (formerly NewsGator Technologies) is a multinational software company headquartered in Denver, Colorado. Sitrion develops and markets mobility and collaboration software. It was founded in 2004 under the name NewsGator. It was initially a consumer company focused on RSS aggregation, before shifting its focus to the enterprise market. The company raised $12 million in funding in 2007 and acquired Tomoye in 2010. In 2013, NewsGator acquired Sitrion, and in 2014, chose to keep the same name.

Corporate history
Sitrion was founded as NewsGator in 2004 by Greg Reinacker and was initially self-funded. Mobius provided an undisclosed amount of Series A and Series B funding in the early 2000s. A third $6 million round of funding was raised in 2005. 

In 2005, the company acquired Bradbury Software, which developed a desktop application called FeedDemon and a CSS/xHTML editor called TopStyle. 

Another $12 million in funding was raised in December 2007, followed by $10 million in 2009. From 2004 to 2010, the company's CEO was JB Holston. 

In 2010, the company acquired Canada-based Tomoye, an enterprise community and collaboration computing vendor, primarily used by government organizations. 

Daniel Kraft became CEO & President in 2012.

In 2013, NewsGator acquired Sitrion, who was previously a business partner. In January of the following year, the company changed its name to Sitrion. While initially, the purchase of Sitrion was intended to expand the product portfolio of NewsGator, it then began focusing on selling social networking software to client companies (a business it had been in since 2007)—specifically Sitrion Social Workplace. Kraft has stated that introducing social collaboration concepts can create a more invested staff, saying, "If you terminate nonproductive conversations, then you’re eliminating the ability to make the network a community people would like to belong to."

In 2018, Sitrion was acquired by employee engagement company, Limeade.

Software

Sitrion Social
Sitrion Social is an add-on for SharePoint, which also integrates with SAP. Version 3.0 of Social Sites (now Sitrion Social) was released in late 2009. Among other improvements, it introduced a microblogging component to the software. In 2012, the company started developing software for vertical markets and products for regulatory compliance in partnership with HiSoftware. A simplified user interface for NewsGator Tomoye was introduced in 2011. Sitrion Social is comparable to Facebook, but designed for use with SharePoint and used for employee collaboration. It is typically used to add functionality to Microsoft SharePoint and SAP processes.

Computers and Applied Sciences reviewed version 2.7 of Social Sites, Sitrion's Facebook-like employee collaboration tool. It praised the software's user interface and synchronization across devices.

Past software

In 2002, Sitrion (then called NewsGator) originally developed consumer RSS software that allowed users to receive notifications when a blog, news site or other page was updated. It was one of few readers that integrated directly with Microsoft Outlook. In 2003, a version 1.3 was introduced that added support for subscribing to newsgroups through Outlook, automated some of the organization features and made other improvements. Version 2.0 was released in March 2004, which allowed users to get notifications from mobile devices, to access exclusive content and made other improvements. By 2004, it was one of the better known RSS tools. It also made a partnership that year with PR firm Edelman to develop a reader tool called Hosted Conversations used by Edelman clients and available to others. Integration with Factiva was also introduced that year. NewsGator started pursuing the enterprise market in late 2005 with a new NewsGator Enterprise Server (NGES) product.

References

Software companies based in Colorado
RSS
Companies based in Denver
2004 establishments in Colorado
Collaborative software
Defunct software companies of the United States